RTV Sana or Radio televizija Sana is a local Bosnian  public cable television channel based in Sanski Most municipality. It was established in 2016 when local Radio Sana started television broadcasting.

RTV Sana broadcasts a variety of programs such as local news, local sports, mosaic and documentaries. Program is mainly produced in Bosnian language.

Radio Sana is also part of public municipality services.

References

External links 
 Official website of RTV Sana
 Communications Regulatory Agency of Bosnia and Herzegovina

Television channels and stations established in 2016
Television stations in Bosnia and Herzegovina